Patricia Loran (born 1946) is a retired Spanish film actress.

Selected filmography
 Seven Pistols for a Gringo (1966)
 Love in Flight (1967)
 Seven Murders for Scotland Yard (1971)
 The Crimes of Petiot (1973)

References

Bibliography
 Thomas Weisser. Spaghetti Westerns: the Good, the Bad and the Violent. McFarland, 2005.

External links

1946 births
Living people
Spanish film actresses
People from Granada